Leo James Frank (July 17, 1895 – March 25, 1961) was an American college football player and coach. He served as the head football coach at Pacific University from 1921 to 1929, Parsons College from 1932 to 1937, and at Puget Sound University from 1938 to 1942, compiling a career college football coaching record of 68–65–13.  Frank died on March 25, 1961, at his home in Menlo Park, California.

Head coaching record

References

External links
 

1895 births
1961 deaths
Coe Kohawks football players
Pacific Boxers football coaches
Parsons Wildcats football coaches
Puget Sound Loggers athletic directors
Puget Sound Loggers football coaches
Sportspeople from Davenport, Iowa